Ectemnia is a genus of 4 species of black flies. They are distributed in  North America.

Species
E. invenusta (Walker, 1848)
E. primaeva Moulton & Adler, 1997
E. reclusa Moulton & Adler, 1997
E. taeniatifrons (Enderlein, 1925)

Literature cited

Simuliidae
Culicomorpha genera